Roman Botvynnyk (born April 27, 1993) is a Ukrainian footballer.

Playing career 
Botvynnyk played with FC Karpaty-2 Lviv in 2010 in the Ukrainian Amateur Football Championship. In 2012, he signed with FC Hoverla Uzhhorod, but signed with FC Skala Stryi in 2014 to play in the Ukrainian Second League. In 2016, he returned to the Ukrainian Amateur Football Championship to play with FC Sambir. The following season he played abroad in the 2. Liga with FK Spišská Nová Ves. In 2017, he signed with Karpaty Krosno in the III liga, and in 2018 he played abroad in the Canadian Soccer League with CSC Mississauga.

References 

1993 births
Living people
Ukrainian footballers
Association football defenders
FC Karpaty-2 Lviv players
FC Skala Stryi (2004) players
FC Sambir players
FK Spišská Nová Ves players
Karpaty Krosno players
2. Liga (Slovakia) players
Canadian Soccer League (1998–present) players
Ukrainian Second League players
Ukrainian expatriate footballers
Expatriate footballers in Poland
Ukrainian expatriate sportspeople in Poland
Expatriate soccer players in Canada
Ukrainian expatriate sportspeople in Canada